Manuel Suárez may refer to:

Manuel Suárez (athlete) (1920–2001), Spanish Olympic hurdler
Manuel Suárez (fencer) (born 1950), Cuban Olympic fencer
Manuel Suárez (Spanish footballer) (died 1936), Spanish footballer
Manuel Suárez (Chilean footballer) (born 1972), Chilean football manager and former goalkeeper
Manuel Suárez (rower) (born 1989), Cuban rower
Manuel Suárez (swimmer), Spanish swimmer
Manuel Suárez Fernández, Spanish Dominican friar and Catholic priest
Manuel Suárez (geologist), a discoverer of Chilesaurus
Manuel Suárez y Suárez (1896–1987), Spanish immigrant to Mexico, entrepreneur and patron of the arts